Lachance is a surname. Notable people with the surname include:

Arthur Lachance (1868–1945), Canadian politician
Candy LaChance (1870–1932), American professional baseball player
Claude-André Lachance (born 1954), Canadian lawyer and politician
Imogen LaChance (1853-1838), American social reformer
Michel Lachance (born 1955), Canadian professional hockey player
Scott Lachance (born 1972), American professional hockey player
Walter William LaChance (1870–1951), Canadian architect